The missing years in the Hebrew calendar refer to a chronological discrepancy between the rabbinic dating for the destruction of the First Temple in 422 BCE (3338 Anno Mundi) and the academic dating of it in 587 BCE.

Dating in academic sources 
The academic datings in question are confirmed by a variety of Persian, Babylonian and Greek sources, which include records of datable astronomical observations such as eclipses.

Siege of Jerusalem (597 BC)

Both the Babylonian Chronicles and the Bible indicate that Nebuchadnezzar captured Jerusalem. The Babylonian Chronicles (as published by Donald Wiseman in 1956) establish that Nebuchadnezzar captured Jerusalem the first time on 2 Adar (16 March) 597 BCE. Before Wiseman's publication, E. R. Thiele had determined from the biblical texts that Nebuchadnezzar's initial capture of Jerusalem occurred in the spring of 597 BCE, while other scholars, including William F. Albright, more frequently dated the event to 598 BCE.

Second siege and destruction of the First Temple

According to the Bible, Nebuchadnezzar installed Zedekiah as king after his first siege, and Zedekiah ruled for 11 years before the second siege resulted in the end of his kingdom.

Although there is no dispute that Jerusalem fell the second time in the summer month of Tammuz, Albright dates the end of Zedekiah's reign (and the fall of Jerusalem) to 587 BCE, whereas Thiele offers 586 BCE. Thiele's reckoning is based on the presentation of Zedekiah's reign on an accession basis, which was used for most but not all of the kings of Judah. In that case, the year that Zedekiah came to the throne would be his first partial year; his first full year would be 597/596 BCE, and his eleventh year, the year Jerusalem fell, would be 587/586 BCE. Since Judah's regnal years were counted from Tishrei in autumn, this would place the end of his reign and the capture of Jerusalem in the summer of 586 BCE.

Dating in traditional Jewish sources
A variety of rabbinic sources state that the Second Temple stood for 420 years. In traditional Jewish calculations, based on Seder Olam Rabbah, the destruction of the Second Temple fell in the year 68 of the Common Era, implying that it was built in about 352 BCE. Adding 70 years between the destruction of the First Temple and the construction of the Second Temple, it follows that the First Temple was destroyed in around 422 BCE. While acceptance of this chronology was widespread among ancient rabbis, it was not universal: Pirkei deRabbi Eliezer, Midrash Lekach Tov, and numerous rishonim disagree with the chronology of Seder Olam Rabbah.

The traditional Jewish date recognized by the rabbis as the "year of destruction" is approximately 165 years later than the accepted year of 587 or 586 BCE. This discrepancy is referred to as the "missing years".

Details of rabbinic chronology

According to the Talmud and Seder Olam Rabbah, the Second Temple stood for 420 years, with the years divided up as follows:
103 years (35 BCE–68 CE) = Herod's Dynasty.
103 years (138 BCE–35 BCE) = Hasmonean Dynasty.
180 years (318 BCE–138 BCE) = Grecian rule over Israel
34 years (352 BCE–318 BCE) = Persian rule while the Second Temple stood (not including additional years of Persian rule before the Temple's construction).

The date of 318 BCE for the Greek conquest of Persia is evident from the Talmud, which implies that that Greek rule began six years before the beginning of the Seleucid era (which occurred in 312/11 BCE). (Note that in academic chronology, Alexander conquered the Persian empire between 334-330 BCE.)

Seventy years passed between the destruction of the First Temple and the building of the Second Temple in the seventy first year, so construction of the Second Temple in 352 BCE implies that the First Temple was destroyed in 423 BCE.

Similarly, Megillat Antiochus implies that the Second Temple was built in 352 BCE, and thus that the First Temple was destroyed in 423 BCE.

The rabbis this passage interpreted as referring to a period of 490 years which would pass between the destructions of the First and Second Temple - 70 years between the Temples, plus 420 years of the Second Temple, starting in the 71st year after the destruction, though the passage can plausibly be interpreted in other ways.

Proposed explanations 
If traditional dates are assumed to be based on the standard Hebrew calendar, then the differing traditional and modern academic dating of events cannot both be correct. Attempts to reconcile the two systems must show one or both to have errors.

Missing years in Jewish tradition 
Scholars see the discrepancy between the traditional and academic date of the destruction of the First Temple arising as a result of Jewish sages missing out the reign lengths of several Persian kings during the Persian Empire's rule over Israel. Modern scholars tally ten Persian kings whose combined reigns total 208 years. By contrast, ancient Jewish sages only mention four Persian kings totaling 52 years. The reigns of several Persian kings appear to be missing from the traditional calculations.

Azariah dei Rossi was likely the first Jewish authority to claim that the traditional Hebrew dating is not historically precise regarding the years before the Second Temple.   Nachman Krochmal agreed with dei Rossi, pointing to the Greek name Antigonos mentioned in Pirkei Avot 1:3 as proof that there must have been a longer period to account for this sign of Hellenic influence. dei Rossi and Krochmal argued that when the length of a historical period was unknown, Seder Olam Rabbah took the method of assuming the shortest possible length.

Solomon Judah Loeb Rapoport noted that the traditional Jewish chronology, when combined with another rabbinic tradition, places the Exodus from Egypt at exactly 1000 years prior to the Seleucid era (known in Jewish sources as "Minyan Shtarot"). He suggests that the authors of the traditional Jewish chronology intentionally omitted years from the Persian period in order to obtain this round number, with the intent that Jews who previously had counted years from the Exodus would be able to easily switch to the Seleucid era system used by Greek rulers at the time.

David Zvi Hoffmann points out that the Mishnah in Avot (1:4) in describing the chain of tradition uses the plural "accepted from them" even though the previous Mishnah only mentions one person. He posits that there must have been another Mishnah mentioning two sages that was later removed.

Shimon Schwab interpreted to Biblical words "seal the words and close the book" as a commandment to obscure the Biblical chronology, so that it would not be possible to accurately calculate the time of the Messiah's arrival. Thus, according to Schwab, the traditional Jewish calendar intentionally omitted years from the Persian period. However, Schwab later withdrew this suggestion for numerous reasons.  

A 2006 article in Ḥakirah journal suggested that the sages were concerned with the acceptance of the Mishnah. There existed a rabbinical tradition that the year 4000 marked the close of the "era of Torah". Thus, it is proposed, the sages arranged the chronology so that the redaction of the Mishnah should coincide with that date and thus have a better chance of acceptance.

Mordechai Breuer suggested that, like other works of midrash, the tradition chronology in Seder Olam Rabbah was never meant to be taken literally but rather was intended to be symbolic.

Some Jewish thinkers, including Chaim Hirschensohn and Adin Steinsaltz, have argued that the original Jewish chronology agreed with the academic chronology, but later misunderstandings or textual corruptions of Seder Olam Rabbah gave the impression that it refers to a shorter period of time. However, Seder Olam Rabbah's chronology is implicit in many different passages, and it is difficult to plausibly explain all these passages in a way that agrees with the academic chronology.

Critiques of academic dating 
Attempts have been made to reinterpret the historical evidence to agree with the rabbinic tradition. The reinterpretation of the Greek, Babylonian and Persian sources that is required to support the traditional dating has been achieved only in parts and rejected by mainstream scholarship.

See also 
 Traditional Jewish chronology

References 
Notes

Bibliography

 Dawn of the Gods: The untold timeline of Genesis, by Marco Lupi Speranza (self published, 2018) – reconstruction in accordance with Sumerian history.
 Jewish History in Conflict: A Study of the Major Discrepancy between Rabbinic and Conventional Chronology, by Mitchell First (Jason Aronson, 1997)
 Talmudic and Rabbinic Chronology, by Edgar Frank (New York: Feldheim 1956)
 Chronology of the Ancient World, by E.J. Bickerman  (Cornell University Press, 1968, 1982)
 The Crime of Claudius Ptolemy. Robert R. Newton (The Johns Hopkins University Press, Baltimore and London, 1977)
 Daniel 9 in  You Take Jesus and I'll Take God by S. Levine, revised edition, Hamoroh Press, Los Angeles, 1980 – explains the Jewish understanding of Daniel 9:24–27
 The Romance of Biblical Chronology , by Martin Anstey (London: Marshall Brothers, 1913) – interprets Daniel as prophesying the crucifixion of Jesus, so the Temple as having been destroyed in 502 BCE
 R' Shimon Schwab in "Comparative Jewish Chronology in Jubilee Volume for Rav Yosef Breuer" pp. 177–197.
 David Zvi Hoffmann "Ha'mishna Rishona" (Heb.)
 Fixing the History Books, Dr. Chaim S. Heifetz's Revision of Persian History, by Brad Aaronson – Jewish scholarly critique of secular dating
 Fixing the Mind by Alexander Eterman – a rebuttal of Heifetz's critique.
 Secular Chronology by Walter R. Dolen  – Christian scholarly critique of secular dating
 Significant Events In Jewish And World History – timeline based on traditional Jewish sources

Chronology
Hebrew calendar
Archaeology of Israel
Solomon's Temple

yi:יידישער לוח#פעלענדיגע יארן אין די אידישע יאר ציילונג